Jeffery Ekins D.D. (died 1791) was an English churchman, Dean of Carlisle Cathedral from 1782.

Life

He was a native of Barton-Seagrave, Northamptonshire, where his father, the Rev. Jeffery Ekins, M.A., was rector. He received his education at Eton College. In 1749 he was elected to King's College, Cambridge, where he obtained a fellowship. He graduated B.A. in 1755 and M.A. in 1758. In early life he was the close companion of Richard Cumberland.

On leaving university he became one of the assistant masters of Eton College, where he was tutor to Frederick Howard, 5th Earl of Carlisle. Subsequently he was chaplain to the Earl of Carlisle when lord-lieutenant of Ireland. He was inducted to the rectory of Quainton, Buckinghamshire, 30 March 1761, on the presentation of his father. In 1775, resigning Quainton, he was instituted to the rectory of Morpeth, Northumberland, on the presentation of the Earl of Carlisle; and in February 1777 he was instituted to the rectory of Sedgefield, Durham. In 1781 he was created D.D. at Cambridge; and in 1782 he was installed Dean of Carlisle, on the advancement of Thomas Percy to the see of Dromore.

He died at Parson's Green on 20 November 1791, and was buried in the chancel of All Saints Church, Fulham. His sister Elizabeth, wife of John Hatsell (Clerk of the House of Commons, 1768-1820) was buried alongside him in 1804.

Works
His works are:

 'Florio; or the Pursuit of Happiness,' a drama, manuscript. 
 A manuscript poem on 'Dreams'. 
 'The Loves of Medea and Jason; a poem in three books translated from the Greek of Apollonius Rhodius's Argonautics,' London, 1771; 2nd edit. 1772.
 'Poems,' London, 1810, pp. 134, including the preceding work and a number of 'Miscellaneous Pieces.' Only sixty copies were printed of this collection.

Family
He married in 1766 Anne, daughter of Philip Baker of Coulston, Wiltshire, and sister of the wife of his brother, John Ekins, dean of Salisbury. Admiral Sir Charles Ekins was their son.

References

Fasti Ecclesiae Anglicanae 1541-1857: volume 11: Carlisle, Chester, Durham, Manchester, Ripon, and Sodor and Man dioceses

Year of birth missing
1791 deaths
People from Barton Seagrave
Alumni of King's College, Cambridge
Deans of Carlisle
People educated at Eton College
Teachers at Eton College
18th-century English Anglican priests